Winner is an abandoned townsite in the former Elkwood Township in southeastern Roseau County, Minnesota, United States.

History
The community of Winner had a post office from 1913 until 1937.

Notes

Former populated places in Minnesota
Former populated places in Roseau County, Minnesota